Sir Thomas Deane was an Irish architect.

Thomas Deane may also refer to:

Sir Thomas Newenham Deane (1828–1899), Irish architect, the son of Sir Thomas Deane
Sir Thomas Manly Deane (1851–1933), Irish architect, the son of Sir Thomas Newenham Deane
Thomas Deane (priest) (1645–1713), Anglican priest in Ireland

See also
Thomas Dean (disambiguation)
Tommy Deans (1922–2000), Scottish footballer